Cho Yong-pil (born March 21, 1950) is a South Korean singer who is considered one of the most influential figures in South Korean popular music. He debuted as a member of the rock band Atkins in 1968 and made his solo debut with the hit single "Come Back to Busan Port" in 1976. Cho has released 19 solo albums and has remained consistently popular during his 50-year career. Nicknamed the "King of Pop" of South Korea, his songs have ranked number one on South Korean music charts in the 1970s, 1980s, 1990s and 2010s. He was recognized with the Eungwan Order of Cultural Merit for his enormous impact on the South Korean pop music scene. He was selected as Singer of the Year and his song "Bounce" was selected as Song of the Year in the surveys conducted by Gallup Korea in 2013.

Career

1950–1967: Early years
Cho Yong-pil was born in Songsan-myeon, Hwaseong, South Korea, and spent part of his childhood in Seoul. He and actor Ahn Sung-ki were schoolmates at the now-defunct Kyungdong Middle School in Seoul and remained friends even though they attended different high schools. When Cho was seven, he happened to listen to Ray Charles playing the harmonica, and this inspired the young Cho to become a musician.

1968–1975: Atkins, Five Fingers and Kim Trio period
Cho began his music career as a guitarist in various bands. In 1968, he formed a rock band called Atkins and played for the United States Army. Later, he founded Five Fingers, which played music by black artists. In 1971, Cho joined the band Kim Trio, which motivated him to perform rock music. Members of Kim Trio included Pa Kim (guitar), Dan Kim (drum) and Sun Kim (keyboard).

1976–1992: Solo debut and commercial success
Cho's debut single as a soloist, "", brought him national attention when it was released in 1976, later becoming a hit in Japan. Cho then made a Japanese-language version of the song, and sang live in Japan. He was accused of smoking marijuana the following year and was banned from performing until 1979. His first album, Woman Outside the Window, was released in 1980 and has been followed by many others. In 1980, he held a concert at Carnegie Hall in New York, the first Korean singer to perform there. In 1988, he became the first South Korean singer to perform in China, before the establishment of diplomatic ties between the two countries.

1992–2012: Commercial decline and concerts
His commercial success declined after the rise of the group Seo Taiji and Boys and many other young musicians. His studio albums released after 1992 were not so successful. Noticing this, he announced that he would stop appearing on television, concluding that he would hardly make any hits. Subsequently, he focused more on concerts and music performance. In 1993, his Busan concert attracted an audience of 1 million, a record for South Korea. The following year, he became the first South Korean singer to surpass 10 million record sales. In 2005, Cho performed a concert in Pyongyang, North Korea, a rare occurrence for a South Korean singer.

2013–2021: Hello and 50th anniversary
In April 2013, Cho released his 19th album titled Hello, which debuted at number one on the South Korean charts, eclipsing Psy's "Gentleman".
On April 25, 2013, he returned to television with the showcase "Hello". This show was also broadcast live on YouTube.

The album ranked number one on the Gaon Album Chart for the week of April 28 – May 4, 2013. Two songs from the album won first place on South Korean music shows: "Hello" and "Bounce". Following the success of Hello, Cho reissued 14 of his old albums. He later released a Japanese version of the album.

In 2018, Cho held a series of concerts to mark his 50th anniversary as a singer.

2022: Road to 20-Prelude 1 
Cho released the single album Road to 20-Prelude 1 on November 18, 2022. To promote the album, he released a 30-second teaser video on his official YouTube channel on November 15. The video contains the titles of the new songs "Moment" and "Like Serengeti". He will hold a solo concert, 2022 Cho Yong-pil and the Great Birth, at the Olympic Gymnastics Arena in Seoul on November 26–27 and December 3–4.

Discography

Korean studio albums

Japanese studio albums

Book 
 Speech which wind conveys (1985)

Awards and nominations

State and cultural honors

External links

References 

Grand Prize Golden Disc Award recipients
Trot singers
K-pop singers
South Korean pop rock singers
South Korean male singers
South Korean singer-songwriters
South Korean rock guitarists
South Korean record producers
People from Gyeonggi Province
People from Hwaseong, Gyeonggi
1950 births
Living people
MAMA Award winners
Korean Music Award winners
Melon Music Award winners
Imcheon Jo clan
South Korean male singer-songwriters